An auxiliary verb (abbreviated ) is a verb that adds functional or grammatical meaning to the clause in which it occurs, so as to express tense, aspect, modality, voice, emphasis, etc. Auxiliary verbs usually accompany an infinitive verb or a participle, which respectively provide the main semantic content of the clause. An example is the verb have in the sentence I have finished my lunch. Here, the auxiliary have helps to express the perfect aspect along with the participle, finished. Some sentences contain a chain of two or more auxiliary verbs. Auxiliary verbs are also called helping verbs, helper verbs, or (verbal) auxiliaries. Research has been conducted into split inflection in auxiliary verbs.

Basic examples
Below are some sentences that contain representative auxiliary verbs from English, Spanish, German and French, with the auxiliary verb marked in bold:

a. Do you want tea? – do is an auxiliary accompanying the infinitive, want, used here to form a question – see do-support.

b. She has given her best shot. – have, from which has is inflected, is an auxiliary used in expressing the perfect aspect of give.

c. He cogido tu lápiz. – he is an auxiliary accompanying the infinitive coger, used here to form a verb phrase, the perfect present in Spanish.
(I) have grabbed your pencil = 'I have taken your pencil.'

d. Das wurde mehrmals gesagt. – werden, from which wurde is inflected, become is an auxiliary used to build the passive voice in German.
That became many times said = 'That was said many times.'

e. Sie ist nach Hause gegangen. – sein, from which ist is inflected, 'be' is an auxiliary used with movement verbs to build the perfect tense/aspect in German.
She is to home gone = 'She went home/She has gone home.'

f. Jai vu le soleil. – avoir, from which ai is inflected, 'have' is an auxiliary used to build the perfect tense/aspect in French.
I have seen the sun = 'I have seen the sun/I saw the sun.'

g. Nous sommes hébergés par un ami. – être, from which sommes is inflected, 'be' is an auxiliary used to build the passive voice in French.
We are hosted by a friend.

These auxiliaries help express a question, show tense/aspect, or form passive voice. Auxiliaries like these typically appear with a full verb that carries the main semantic content of the clause.

Traits across languages
Auxiliary verbs typically help express grammatical tense, aspect, mood, and voice. They generally appear together with an infinitive. The auxiliary is said to "help" the infinitive. The auxiliary verbs of a language form a closed class, i.e., there is a fixed, relatively small number of them.

Widely acknowledged verbs that can serve as auxiliaries in English and many related languages are the equivalents of be to express passive voice, and have (and sometimes be) to express perfect aspect or past time reference.

In some treatments, the copula be is classed as an auxiliary even though it does not "help" another verb, e.g.,

The bird is in the tree. – is serves as a copula with a predicative expression not containing any other verb.

Definitions of auxiliary verbs are not always consistent across languages, or even among authors discussing the same language. Modal verbs may or may not be classified as auxiliaries, depending on the language. In the case of English, verbs are often identified as auxiliaries based on their grammatical behavior, as described below. In some cases, verbs that function similarly to auxiliaries, but are not considered full members of that class (perhaps because they carry some independent lexical information), are called semi-auxiliaries. In French, for example, verbs such as devoir (have to), pouvoir (be able to), aller (be going to), vouloir (want), faire (make), and laisser (let), when used together with the infinitive of another verb, can be called semi-auxiliaries. There has also been a study on auxiliary verb constructions in Dravidian languages.

In English

The following sections consider auxiliary verbs in English. They list auxiliary verbs, then present the diagnostics that motivate this special class (subject-auxiliary inversion and negation with not). The modal verbs are included in this class, due to their behavior with respect to these diagnostics.

List of auxiliaries in English
A list of verbs that (can) function as auxiliaries in English is as follows:

be, can, could, dare, do, have, may, might, must, need, ought, shall, should, will, would

The status of dare (not), need (not), and ought (to) is debatable and the use of these verbs as auxiliaries can vary across dialects of English. If the negative forms can't, don't, won't, etc. are viewed as separate verbs (and not as contractions), then the number of auxiliaries increases. The verbs do and have can also function as full verbs or as light verbs, which can be a source of confusion about their status. The modal verbs (can, could, may, might, must, shall, should, will, would, and dare, need and ought when included) form a subclass of auxiliary verbs. Modal verbs are defective insofar as they cannot be inflected, nor do they appear as gerunds, infinitives, or participles.

The following table summarizes the auxiliary verbs in standard English and the meaning contribution to the clauses in which they appear. Many auxiliary verbs are listed more than once in the table based upon discernible differences in use.

{| class="wikitable"
|-
! Auxiliary verb !! Meaning contribution !! Example
|-
| be1 || copula (= linking verb) || She is the boss. 
|-
| be2 || progressive aspect || He is sleeping.
|-
| be3 || passive voice || They were seen.
|-
| can1 || deontic modality || I can swim. 
|-
| can2 || epistemic modality || Such things can help.
|-
| could1 || deontic modality || I could swim.
|-
| could2 || epistemic modality || That could help. 
|-
| dare || deontic modality || I dare not attempt it.
|-
| do1 || do-support/emphasis || You did not understand.
|-
|do2
|question
|Do you like it?
|-
| have || perfect aspect || They have understood.
|-
| may1 || deontic modality || May I stay?
|-
| may2 || epistemic modality || That may take place.
|-
| might || epistemic modality || We might give it a try.
|-
| must1 || deontic modality || You must not mock me.
|-
| must2 || epistemic modality || It must have rained.
|-
| need || deontic modality || You need not water the grass.
|-
| ought || deontic modality || You ought to play well.
|-
| shall || deontic modality || You shall not pass.
|-
| should1 || deontic modality || You should listen.
|-
| should2 || epistemic modality || That should help. 
|-
| will1 || epistemic modality || We will eat pie.
|-
| will2 || future tense || The sun will rise tomorrow at 6:03.
|-
| will3 || habitual aspect || He will make that mistake every time.
|- 
| would1 || epistemic modality || Nothing would accomplish that.
|-
| would2 || future-in-the-past tense || After 1990, we would do that again.
|-
| would3 || habitual aspect || Back then we would always go there.
|}

Deontic modality expresses an ability, necessity, or obligation that is associated with an agent subject. Epistemic modality expresses the speaker's assessment of reality or likelihood of reality. Distinguishing between the two types of modality can be difficult, since many sentences contain a modal verb that allows both interpretations.

List of Auxiliaries Unique to African American Vernacular English 
African American Vernacular English makes a variety of finer tense/aspect distinctions than other dialects of English by making use of unique variant forms of, in particular: habitual 'be', reduced 'done' (dən), and stressed 'been' (BIN):

Diagnostics for identifying auxiliary verbs in English
The verbs listed in the previous section can be classified as auxiliaries based upon two diagnostics: they allow subject–auxiliary inversion (the type of inversion used to form questions etc.) and (equivalently) they can take not as a postdependent (a dependent that follows its head). The following examples illustrate the extent to which subject–auxiliary inversion can occur with an auxiliary verb but not with a full verb:

a. He was working today.
b. Was he working today? - Auxiliary verb was allows subject–auxiliary inversion.

a. He worked today.
b. *Worked he today? - Full verb worked does not allow subject–auxiliary inversion.

a. She can see it.
b. Can she see it? - Auxiliary verb can allows subject–auxiliary inversion.

a. She sees it.
b. *Sees she it? - Full verb sees does not allow subject–auxiliary inversion.

(The asterisk * is the means commonly used in linguistics to indicate that the example is grammatically unacceptable or that a particular construction has never been attested in use.) The following examples illustrate that the negation not can appear as a postdependent of a finite auxiliary verb, but not as a postdependent of a finite full verb:

a. Sam would try that.
b. Sam would not try that. - The negation not appears as a postdependent of the finite auxiliary would.

a. Sam tried that.
b. *Sam tried not that. - The negation not cannot appear as a postdependent of the finite full verb tried.
a. Tom could help.
b. Tom could not help. - The negation not appears as a postdependent of the finite auxiliary could.

a. Tom helped.
b. *Tom helped not. - The negation not cannot appear as a postdependent of the finite full verb helped.

A third diagnostic that can be used for identifying auxiliary verbs is verb phrase ellipsis. See the article on verb phrase ellipsis for examples.

These criteria lead to the copula be and non-copular use of be as an existential verb being considered an auxiliary (it undergoes inversion and takes postdependent not, e.g., Is she the boss?, She is not the boss, Is there a God?, There is a God). However, if one defines auxiliary verb as a verb that somehow "helps" another verb, then the copula be is not an auxiliary, because it appears without another verb. The literature on auxiliary verbs is somewhat inconsistent in this area.

There are also some properties that some but not all auxiliary verbs have. Their presence can be used to conclude that the verb is an auxiliary, but their absence does not guarantee the converse. One such property is to have the same form in the present tense, also for the first and the third person singular. This in particular is typical for modal auxiliary verbs, such as will and must. (Examples: He will come tomorrow, she must do it at once, not he wills or she musts.)

Vs. light verbs
Some syntacticians distinguish between auxiliary verbs and light verbs. The two are similar insofar as both verb types contribute mainly just functional information to the clauses in which they appear. Hence both do not qualify as separate predicates, but rather they form part of a predicate with another expression - usually with a full verb in the case of auxiliary verbs and usually with a noun in the case of light verbs.

In English, light verbs differ from auxiliary verbs in that they cannot undergo inversion and they cannot take not as a postdependent. The verbs have and do can function as auxiliary verbs or as light verbs (or as full verbs). When they are light verbs, they fail the inversion and negation diagnostics for auxiliaries, e.g.

Note that in some dialects (for example, the West and South West dialects of Hiberno-English), the inversion test may sound correct to native speakers.
 
a. They had a long meeting.
 
b. *Had they a long meeting? - Light verb had fails the inversion test.

c. *They had not a long meeting. - Light verb had fails the negation test.

a. She did a report on pandering politicians.
 
b. *Did she a report on pandering politicians? - Light verb did fails the inversion test.
 
c. *She did not a report on pandering politicians. - Light verb did fails the negation test.

(In some cases, though, have may undergo auxiliary-type inversion and negation even when it is not used as an auxiliary verb – see .)
 
Sometimes the distinction between auxiliary verbs and light verbs is overlooked or confused. Certain verbs (e.g., used to, have to, etc.) may be judged as light verbs by some authors, but as auxiliaries by others.

See also
 Compound verb
 English verbs
 Irregular verb
 Modal verb
 Tense–aspect–mood

Notes

References

Allerton, D. 2006. Verbs and their Satellites. In Handbook of English Linguistics. Aarts 7 MacMahon (eds.). Blackwell.
Adger, D. 2003. Core syntax. Oxford, UK: Oxford University Press.
Anderson, Gregory D. S. 2011. Auxiliary Verb Constructions (and Other Complex Predicate Types): A Functional-Constructional Typology. Language and Linguistics Compass 5 (11): 795–828.
Bresnan, J. 2001. Lexical-Functional Syntax. Malden, MA: Blackwell Publishers.
Culicover, P. 2009. Natural language syntax. Oxford, UK: Oxford University Press.
Crystal, D. 1997. A dictionary of linguistics and phonetics, 4th edition. Oxford, UK: Blackwell Publishers.
Engel, U. 1994. Syntax der deutschen Sprache, 3rd edition. Berlin: Erich Schmidt Verlag.
Eroms, H.-W. 2000. Syntax der deutschen Sprache. Berlin: de Gruyter.
Finch, G. 2000. Linguistic terms and concepts. New York: St. Martin's Press.
Fowler's Modern English Usage. 1996. Revised third edition. Oxford, UK: Oxford University Press.
Jurafsky, M. and J. Martin. 2000. Speech and language processing. Dorling Kindersley (India): Pearson Education, Inc.
Kroeger, P. 2004. Analyzing syntax: A lexical-functional approach. Cambridge, UK: Cambridge University Press.
Lewis, M. The English Verb 'An Exploration of Structure and Meaning'. Language Teaching Publications. 
Osborne, T. and T. Groß 2012. Constructions are catenae: Construction Grammar meets Dependency Grammar. Cognitive Linguistics 23, 1, 165–216.
Radford, A. 1997. Syntactic theory and the structure of English: A minimalist approach. Cambridge, UK: Cambridge University Press.
Radford, A. 2004. English syntax: An introduction. Cambridge, UK: Cambridge University Press.
Rowlett, P. 2007. The syntax of French. Cambridge, UK: Cambridge University Press.
Sag, I. and T. Wasow. 1999. Syntactic theory: A formal introduction. Stanford, CA: CSLI Publications.
Tesnière, L. 1959. Éleménts de syntaxe structurale. Paris: Klincksieck.
Warnant, L. 1982. Structure syntaxique du français. Librairie Droz.

Verb types